This is a list of the highest natural points within the  area of Greater London, England. The list includes all 21 peaks at least 100 metres high.

One is an isolated hill, at Harrow on the Hill – the other 20 summits are clustered on six ridges (escarpments) in London, four of which extend beyond London and are named: Blackheath Ridge, one of the North Weald Ridges, the North Downs ridge and the Grim's Ditch ridge.

List

‡ this summit in Hampstead Heath is the highest point in Inner London and was the highest point of the former County of London.

Settlements

It is at the edge of the Surrey Hills AONB which covers the Surrey part of the North Downs and Greensand Ridge.

Outside Bromley the highest settlements are Sanderstead and Selsdon (reaching  and five metres below that, respectively) in Croydon.

Lower neighbours are Monken Hadley and Chipping Barnet, both , and Barnet Gate .

The Vale of Health is a micro-locality in Hampstead Heath in Camden at (. Harrow on the Hill in Harrow and Shooters Hill in Greenwich also have high positions.

Some have peaks or crests (in the table above) in their definitively built-up area (e.g. Sanderstead, Harrow on the Hill and Shooters Hill). Other settlements with a high central or near-centre elevation (over ) include Upper Sydenham, Upper Norwood, Chislehurst, Highgate, Muswell Hill, Hampstead, Harefield, Northwood, Mill Hill, Whetstone, Stanmore, Carshalton, Coombe, New Addington and Purley.

See also
List of highest points in the United Kingdom
List of tallest buildings and structures in London

References

 
Geography of London
London
Prom